Holly Ridge is an unincorporated community in Richland Parish, Louisiana, United States.

History
In 1908 the Chess and Wymond company purchased over 6000 acres in the area now known as Holly Ridge. They named the site after the thousands of holly trees growing along the hilltops.

References

Unincorporated communities in Richland Parish, Louisiana
Unincorporated communities in Louisiana